The 1985 Australian Film Institute Awards were awards held by the Australian Film Institute to celebrate the best of Australian films of 1985.

Feature film

Non-feature film

References

External links
 Official AACTA website

AACTA Awards ceremonies
1985 in Australian cinema